The Pennington Biomedical Research Center is a health science-focused research center in Baton Rouge, Louisiana. It is part of the Louisiana State University System and conducts clinical, basic, and population science research. It is the largest academically-based nutrition research center in the world, with the greatest number of obesity researchers on faculty.  The center's over 500 employees occupy several buildings on the  campus. The center was designed by the Baton Rouge architect John Desmond.

History 
In 1980, Baton Rouge oilman and philanthropist C. B. "Doc" Pennington and his wife, Irene, provided $125 million to fund construction of the nutritional research center. With a U.S. Department of Defense contract and funding from the Louisiana Public Facilities Authority, Governor Buddy Roemer proclaimed the official opening of the Center in 1988. Dr George A. Bray, a renowned obesity researcher, was recruited to be the first executive director of the center and under his leadership the center reached its present status in the scientific world.

Today, the Pennington Biomedical Research Center houses almost 600 employees, 14 research laboratories, 17 core service laboratories, an inpatient and outpatient clinic, two metabolic chambers, a research kitchen, an administrative area, more than $20 million in technologically advanced equipment, and a team of over 80 scientists and physicians with specialties such as molecular biology, genomics and proteomics, neuroanatomy, exercise physiology, biochemistry, psychology, endocrinology, biostatistics and electrophysiology.

One of the former employees was the late state legislator Leonard J. Chabert from Terrebonne Parish, the namesake of the Leonard J. Chabert Medical Center in Houma.

Research programs and labs 
The comprehensive research program at the Pennington Biomedical Research Center focuses on ten specific research program areas as outlined below. Researchers in these divisions rely on the latest molecular, physiological, clinical, behavioral, and bioinformatics technologies with the ultimate goal of preventing common diseases such as heart disease, diabetes, hypertension, and cancer.
Cancer: Clinical Oncology & Metabolism, Cancer Energetics 
Diabetes: Antioxidant and Gene Regulation, John S McIlhenny Skeletal Muscle Physiology, John S. McIlhenny Botanical Research, Joint Program on Diabetes, Endocrinology and Metabolism, Oxidative Stress and Disease
Epidemiology and Prevention: Chronic Disease Epidemiology, Contextual Risk Factors, Nutritional Epidemiology, Physical Activity and Obesity Epidemiology
Genomics & Molecular Genetics: Gene-Nutrient Interactions, Genetics of Eating Behavior, Human Genomics, Regulation of Gene Expression
Neurobiology: Autonomic Neuroscience, Leptin Signaling in the Brain, Neurobiology & Nutrition, Neurobiology of Metabolic Dysfunction Lab, Neurosignaling, Nutrition & Neural Signaling, 
Neurodegeneration: Aging and Neurodegeneration, Blood Brain Barrier I, Blood Brain Barrier II, Inflammation and Neurodegeneration, Nutritional Neuroscience and Aging
Nutrient Sensing & Signaling: Nutrient Sensing and Adipocyte Signaling
Obesity: Behavior Modification Clinical Trials, Behavior Technology Laboratory: Eating Disorders and Obesity, Behavioral Medicine, Infection and Obesity, Ingestive Behavior Laboratory, Pediatric Obesity and Health Behavior, Pharmacology-based Clinical Trials, Reproductive Endocrinology & Women's Health, Women's Health, Eating Behavior, & Smoking Cessation Program
Physical Activity & Health: Exercise Biology, Human Physiology, Inactivity Physiology, Physical Activity & Ethnic Minority Health, Preventive Medicine, Walking Behavior
Stem Cell & Developmental Biology: Developmental Biology, Epigenetics & Nuclear Reprogramming, Ubiquitin Biology

Core services  
Pennington Biomedical Research Center provides core services in three specific areas (i.e., Basic Science, Clinical Science, and Population Science) to support researchers and increase the efficiency and accuracy of investigative procedures.

The Basic Science Core allows researchers to use cutting edge technology in the following areas: comparative biology, animal behavior, animal metabolism, cell and tissue imaging and microscopy, cell culture facilities, genomics, transgenics, proteomics and metabolomics.
The Clinical Science Core provides researchers access to clinical research study protocol development tools, Internal Review Board (IRB) submission, budgeting assistance, and contract support. The Center assists with study participant recruitment, specimen collection, processing and analysis, dietary assessment, exercise testing, psychological review, and phlebotomy. The Core also provides meal preparation using the Metabolic Kitchen and provides support for data collection and storage.
The Population Science Core provides researchers with statistical support for studies, data management assistance, and access to the Library and Information Center which provides bibliographic instruction, interlibrary loan processing, and other services.

Centers of excellence 
The National Institutes of Health (NIH) awards center grants to institutions with groups of established researchers working in a variety of scientific research fields. There are three NIH Centers of Excellence at Pennington Biomedical Research Center. the Center for Research on Botanicals and Metabolic Syndrome (BRC), the Center of Biomedical Research Excellence (COBRE), and the Nutrition and Obesity Research Center (NORC)

References

External links
Official website

Louisiana State University System
Biochemistry research institutes
Medical research institutes in the United States
Buildings and structures in Baton Rouge, Louisiana
Educational institutions established in 1981
1981 establishments in Louisiana
Neuroscience research centers in the United States
Research institutes in Louisiana